Jack Lebsock is an American country music artist, also known as Jack Grayson, "Blackjack" Jack Grayson and Jack Grayson and Blackjack. He recorded under various labels between 1973 and 1984, charting thirteen times on the Billboard Hot  Country Singles (now Hot Country Songs) charts. Grayson's biggest chart hit is a No. 18-peaking cover of Percy Sledge's "When a Man Loves a Woman." Lebsock was also, in the 1970s, a writer for ABC Music Publishing, having written songs for Roy Clark. He also wrote three of Freddie Hart's singles: "Bless Your Heart", "Super Kind of Woman", and "The First Time".

Discography

Albums

Singles

References

American country singer-songwriters
American male singer-songwriters
Country musicians from Colorado
Living people
Year of birth missing (living people)
Singer-songwriters from Colorado